Yelan is an urban locality (a work settlement) and the administrative center of Yelansky District in Volgograd Oblast, Russia. The population was

References

Urban-type settlements in Volgograd Oblast
Atkarsky Uyezd
Populated places established in 1691
1691 establishments in Russia